Bek-Jar is a village in Osh Region of Kyrgyzstan. It is part of the Kara-Suu District. Its population was 1,259 in 2021.

The village of Laglan is 3.9 miles (6.2 km) to the south.

References

External links 
Satellite map at Maplandia.com

Populated places in Osh Region